Portable Compiled Format (PCF) is a bitmap font format used by X Window System in its core font system, and has been used for decades. PCF fonts are usually installed, by default, on most Unix-based operating systems, and are used in terminals such as xterm. PCF fonts replaced Bitmap Distribution Format due to a slight efficiency increase, however most applications have moved on to scalable fonts.

See also
Glyph Bitmap Distribution Format
Server Normal Format

References

External links
 PCF (Portable Compiled Format)
 Format for X11 pcf bitmap font files

Font formats